Turkish women in cinema refers to Turkish actresses and to female movie directors in Turkish cinema. The first Turkish film was made in 1914; the first Turkish film with actresses was not shot until 1919.  The first leading actress in Turkish cinema was Bedia Muvahhit in 1923. In a conservative Muslim society, Muvahhit's film was a milestone.

Actresses

Movie directors

Filmmakers
Tuluhan Tekelioğlu

References

 
Cinema
20th-century Turkish actresses
Turkish film-related lists